Lei Mingqiu (born June 1942) is a retired general of the People's Liberation Army (PLA) of China. He served as Political Commissar of the Nanjing Military Region.

Lei was born in Qiyang County (now Qidong County), Hunan, in June 1942. He entered aeronautic industry school in Zhuzhou in 1959. He joined the PLA in August 1962, and the Chinese Communist Party in June 1964. In 1971, he became an official at political department of PLA Guangzhou Military Region. He entered PLA political academy in 1980. In 1982, he was promoted to director of political department of army division. He became a vice political commissar of army corps in 1983, and political commissar of army corps in 1985. In January 1992, he was elevated to the director of political department of Guangzhou Military Region. In December 1994, he was transferred to Nanjing Military Region and became vice political commissar, secretary of commission for discipline inspection, and a CPC standing committee member of that MR. He was promoted to political commissar of Nanjing Military Region in December 2000. In March 2008, he was appointed as vice director of ethnicity committee of National People's Congress. 

He attained the rank of major general in September 1988, lieutenant general in July 1994, and a general in 2004. 

He was a member of 13th, 14th, 15th and 16th Central Committees of Chinese Communist Party, and a standing committee member of the 11th National People's Congress.

References

1942 births
Living people
People's Liberation Army generals from Hunan
Delegates to the 11th National People's Congress
Members of the 13th Central Committee of the Chinese Communist Party
Members of the 14th Central Committee of the Chinese Communist Party
Members of the 15th Central Committee of the Chinese Communist Party
Members of the 16th Central Committee of the Chinese Communist Party
People's Republic of China politicians from Hunan
Politicians from Hengyang
Chinese Communist Party politicians from Hunan